Wayne Judson (born 11 July 1952) is a former Australian rules footballer who played for St Kilda in the Victorian Football League (VFL) during the 1970s. 

Judson was a back pocket specialist and spent seven years with St Kilda. He played in St Kilda's losing 1971 Grand Final team to cap off a solid debut season which saw him play 18 games. A Victorian representative, he was a member of the state side which competed at the 1975 Knockout Carnival. He left St Kilda after struggling in 1977 and joined Victorian Football Association club Mordialloc.

References
Holmesby, Russell and Main, Jim (2007). The Encyclopedia of AFL Footballers. 7th ed. Melbourne: Bas Publishing.

External links

1952 births
Living people
Australian rules footballers from Victoria (Australia)
St Kilda Football Club players
Mordialloc Football Club players